Daw or DAW may refer to:

People and language
 Daw (given name)
 Daw (surname)
 Daw, an honorific used in Burmese names
 Dâw people, an indigenous people of Brazil
 Dâw language, a language of Brazil
 Davaoeño language, ISO 939-3 language code daw, Philippines

Places
Daw, an important city, possibly modern Gebel Adda, in the medieval kingdom of Dotawo
Daw, Mauritania
Daw Mill, a mine in Warwickshire, England
Daw Park, South Australia, a suburb of Adelaide
Daw's Castle, a hill fort in Somerset, England
Skyhaven Airport in Rochester, New Hampshire, with FAA location identifier DAW

Organizations
 DAW Books, an American publisher 
 German Equipment Works, an SS defense contractor
 Division for the Advancement of Women, part of UN Women

Other uses
 daW, or decawatt, a unit meaning 10 Watts
 Daw or Western jackdaw, a bird species of the crow family
 "D.A.W.", an episode of Law & Order: Criminal Intent (season 3)
 Digital audio workstation, a device for recording audio files 
 DAW, "Dispense as written", an abbreviation used in medical prescriptions

See also
 Dawe (disambiguation)
 Daou (disambiguation)
 Daws (disambiguation)